The 1939 Titleholders Championship was contested from January 16–19 at Augusta Country Club. It was the 3rd edition of the Titleholders Championship.

This event was won by Patty Berg.

Final leaderboard

External links
Pittsburgh Post-Gazette source

Titleholders Championship
Golf in Georgia (U.S. state)
Titleholders Championship
Titleholders Championship
Titleholders
Titleholders Championship
Women's sports in Georgia (U.S. state)